Rick Jordan Chocolatier is a small batch artisan bean-to-bar chocolate manufacturer based in St. Louis, Missouri, United States. A graduate of both L'Ecole Culinare and Ecole Chocolat, founder and head chocolatier Pastry Chef Rick Jordan then traveled to France to study under chocolatier Patrick Roger.  After 7 years of education, Pastry Chef Rick Jordan opened the business in 2011 and was subsequently named one of the Top Ten Chocolatiers of North America by Dessert Professional in 2012. Since 2012, Rick Jordan Chocolatier has won several awards.

In 2017, Rick Jordan Chocolatier closed their retail store to open a wholesale production facility in order to scale their most successful product, Honey Foam. One may find their products online via the website or at retail partners also listed on their website www.rjchocolatier.com.

Products 
Rick Jordan Chocolatier sells chocolate candies and confections, made using local ingredients.

Honey Foam.

See also 
 List of bean-to-bar chocolate manufacturers
Patrick Roger MOF

References

Brand name chocolate
American chocolate companies
Companies established in 2011
Food and drink companies based in St. Louis
Manufacturing companies based in St. Louis